Darwin Dragons SC was an Australian soccer club from Darwin, Northern Territory, Australia. Darwin Dragons played in the NT Northern Zone Premier League in 2007.

References

External links 
 Darwin Dragons SC FFNT Official Webpage
 Darwin Dragons Website

Soccer clubs in the Northern Territory
Sport in Darwin, Northern Territory

Defunct soccer clubs in Australia